Zin Poshteh (also Romanized as Zīn Poshteh; also known as Zīneh Poshteh) is a village in Deylaman Rural District, Deylaman District, Siahkal County, Gilan Province, Iran. At the 2006 census, its population was 44, in 12 families.

References 

Populated places in Siahkal County